Olai Ingemar Eikeland (23 July 1915 – 14 April 2003) was a Norwegian politician for the Centre Party.

He was elected to the Norwegian Parliament from Vest-Agder in 1961, and was re-elected in the 1962 revote. He had previously served in the position of deputy representative in the period 1958–1961.

Eikeland was born in Vennesla and a member of Vennesla municipal council in the years 1947–1951 and 1954–1975. From 1975 to 1983 he was a member of Vest-Agder county council.

Outside politics he was a farmer. He chaired the regional chapter of the Norwegian Agrarian Association on two occasions, and became honorary member in 1983. He was also active in the Evangelical Lutheran Free Church of Norway.

References

1915 births
2003 deaths
Centre Party (Norway) politicians
Members of the Storting
Vest-Agder politicians
Norwegian farmers
20th-century Norwegian politicians
People from Vennesla